Fever is a 1991 made-for-TV thriller film, starring Armand Assante, Marcia Gay Harden and Sam Neill. It was written by Larry Brothers and directed by Larry Elikann. The film was first aired at HBO on May 11, 1991.

Plot
Ray had just left prison and looks to resume his relationship with Lacy. However, she is now, almost married to Elliott and doesn't want to know  anything about him. When she is kidnapped by Ray's former associates, he and Eliott needs to join forces to save her.

Cast
 Armand Assante as Ray
 Marcia Gay Harden as Lacy
 Sam Neill as Eliott
 John Achorn as Parole Board Member
 Joe Spano as Junkman
 Mark Boone Junior as Leonard
 Jon Gries as Bobby
 Gordon Clapp as Meeks
 Gregg Henry as Dexter
 Francesca Buller as Denise

References

External links
 
 YouTube

American thriller television films
1991 films
1991 thriller films
Films directed by Larry Elikann
1990s American films